Fulgencio Zúñiga (born July 23, 1977) is a Colombian professional boxer and former IBO super middleweight champion.

Early career 
Fulgencio Zúñiga made his first national appearance in 1997 in the 48th National Boxing Tournament held in the city of Bucaramanga, Santander, where he claimed the gold medal in the super middleweight division.  In the same year of 1997 he participated in the following tournaments:

13th Bolivarian Games.  Arequipa, Peru.  Gold Medalist.
Central American Boxing Championship.  Tijuana, Mexico.  Silver Medalist.
4th Pan-American Boxing Championship.  Medellín, Colombia.

During 1998 and 1999 Fulgencio Zúñiga continued his impressive amateur boxing career by winning the 49th National Boxing Tournament held in Santa Marta, Magdalena, thus becoming a two-time national champion.  Then he represented Colombia in the following championships:

6th South American Games (a.k.a. Odesur Games).  Cuenca, Ecuador.  Gold Medalist.
Roberto Balado Cup.  Havana, Cuba.  Bronze Medalist.
6th South American Championship.  Quito, Ecuador.
Córdoba Cardín Tournament.  Havana, Cuba.

Professional
Zúñiga turned pro on February 11, 2001, when he faced Manuel Cabarcas in Barranquilla, scoring a TKO in round one.  From March 2001 to November 2002 he faced fourteen opponents, all of whom were knocked out in the first rounds.  On June 28, 2003, he faced Daniel Santos of San Juan, Puerto Rico, who eventually outpointed the Colombian fighter.  Then Zúñiga faced better opponents, such as former IBC middleweight champion José Luis Zertuche; three-time middleweight championship challenger Antwun Echols; New Yorker George Walton, and highly regarded Kelly Pavlik. After defeating Zúñiga, "The Ghost" Pavlik said: "This is the toughest fight I have ever fought.  I don’t know if anyone in the middleweight division could fight this guy [Zúñiga] at this pace."

Professional boxing record (incomplete)

| style="text-align:center;" colspan="8"|43 fights, 28 wins (25 knockouts), 14 losses (7 knockouts), 1 draw
|-  style="text-align:center; background:#e3e3e3;"
|  style="border-style:none none solid solid; "|Result
|  style="border-style:none none solid solid; "|Record
|  style="border-style:none none solid solid; "|Opponent
|  style="border-style:none none solid solid; "|Type
|  style="border-style:none none solid solid; "|Round, time
|  style="border-style:none none solid solid; "|Date
|  style="border-style:none none solid solid; "|Location
|  style="border-style:none none solid solid; "|Notes
|- align=center
|Loss
|28-14-1
|align=left| Joel Tambwe Djeko
|
|
|
|align=left|
|align=left|
|- align=center
|Win
|28-13-1
|align=left| Javier Meza
|
|
|
|align=left|
|align=left|
|- align=center
|Loss
|27-13-1
|align=left| Ruslan Fayfer
|
|
|
|align=left|
|align=left|
|- align=center
|Loss
|27-12-1
|align=left| Yuniel Dorticos
|
|
|
|align=left|
|align=left|
|- align=center
|Loss
|27-11-1
|align=left| Sean Monaghan
|
|
|
|align=left|
|align=left|
|- align=center
|Loss
|27-10-1
|align=left| Gilberto Ramirez
|
|
|
|align=left|
|align=left|
|- align=center
|Win
|27-9-1
|align=left| Jesus Bermudez
|
|
|
|align=left|
|align=left|
|- align=center
|Loss
|26-9-1
|align=left| Hassan N'Dam N'Jikam
|
|
|
|align=left|
|align=left|
|- align=center
|Win
|26-8-1
|align=left| Oney Valdez
|
|
|
|align=left|
|align=left|
|- align=center
|Loss
|25-8-1
|align=left| Alejandro Berrio
|
|
|
|align=left|
|align=left|
|- align=center
|Loss
|25-7-1
|align=left| James DeGale
|
|
|
|align=left|
|align=left|
|- align=center
|Loss
|25-6-1
|align=left| Thomas Oosthuizen
|
|
|
|align=left|
|align=left|
|- align=center
|Win
|25-5-1
|align=left| Alejandro Berrio
|
|
|
|align=left|
|align=left|  
|- align=center
|Loss
|25-5-1
|align=left| Tavoris Cloud
|
|
|
|align=left|
|align=left|
|- align=center
|Win
|25-4-1
|align=left| Anibal Miranda
|
|
|
|align=left|
|align=left|  
|- align=center
|Win
|24-4-1
|align=left| Jose Chiquillo
|
|
|
|align=left|
|align=left|  
|- align=center
|Loss
|23-4-1
|align=left| Lucian Bute
|
|
|
|align=left|
|align=left|
|- align=center
|Win
|23-3-1
|align=left| Diego Castillo
|
|
|
|align=left|
|align=left| 
|- align=center
|Loss
|22-3-1
|align=left| Denis Inkin
|
|
|
|align=left|
|align=left|
|- align=center
|Win
|23-2-1
|align=left| Elias Ruiz
|
|
|
|align=left|
|align=left| 
|- align=center
|Win
|22-2-1
|align=left| Victor Oganov
|
|
|
|align=left|
|align=left|
|- align=center
|Win
|21-2-1
|align=left| Antwun Echols
|
|
|
|align=left|
|align=left| 
|- align=center
|Win
|20-2-1
|align=left| José Luis Zertuche
|
|
|
|align=left|
|align=left| 
|- align=center
|Loss
|19-2-1
|align=left| Kelly Pavlik
|
|
|
|align=left|
|align=left|

References

External links

|- 

1977 births
Living people
Colombian male boxers
Middleweight boxers
Sportspeople from Cauca Department